Kevin Holt (born 25 January 1993) is a Scottish footballer, born in Dumfries, who plays as a left-back for Scottish Championship club Partick Thistle. Holt started his career with local side Queen of the South before playing for Dundee and Pafos, then returning to The Doonhamers.

Playing career

Queen of the South (First spell)
Holt joined Queen of the South in August 2010 and began playing for their Under-19 squad. In June 2011, Holt was awarded the Jade Moore Memorial Trophy for being Queens under-19s player of the season. Holt debuted for the first-team on 17 September 2011, appearing as a substitute in a 4–1 victory versus Greenock Morton in a Scottish First Division fixture replacing hat-trick scorer Kevin Smith.

Holt made his first senior start on 12 November 2011, versus Partick Thistle in a goalless home draw. Holt was sent off versus Dundee in December 2011 and this was his first ever dismissal. Holt's debut in the Scottish Cup was in a 1–0 away win versus the Maryhill Magyars on 7 January 2012 with the goal scored by Dan Carmichael. This was Queens first win in the competition since their 4–3 semi-final win versus Aberdeen in 2008 at Hampden Park. At the end of the 2011–12 season Queens were relegated to the Scottish Second Division but despite this Holt remained with the club, having signed a new contract in December 2011. He scored 6 goals in 137 competitive QoS first team games.

Dundee
In May 2015, Holt signed a pre-contract with Scottish Premiership club Dundee and the move was completed during the summer of 2015. After three seasons with Dundee, Holt was released at the end of the 2017-18 season. Holt scored 8 goals in 113 competitive first-team matches for the Dee.

Pafos
On 9 June 2018, after being released by Dundee, Holt signed for Cypriot club Pafos. 
Pafos ended their 22 matches in eighth position out of twelve clubs and entered the league's relegation section.

Queen of the South (Second spell)
On 27 May 2019, Holt signed for Queen of the South for a second spell on a two-year contract. The club announced Holt's departure from the club in September 2020.

Ermis Aradippou 
On 11 September 2020, Holt returned to Cyprus to sign for Ermis Aradippou.

Partick Thistle
Holt signed a two year deal with Scottish Championship club Partick Thistle in May 2021.
Holt scored his first goal for Thistle, heading in from a corner in a 3-0 away win against Dunfermline.

Personal life
Kevin Holt is the son of the Dumfries born footballer Gordon Holt. Gordon played for Kello Rovers in the Scottish Junior ranks before turning professional when he played for Airdrieonians during the 1986-87 season and then for Stranraer during the 1987-88 season.

In 2011, Holt was studying for a career in banking.

Career statistics

Honours
Queen of the South
 Scottish Second Division: 2012–13
 Scottish Challenge Cup: 2012–13

External links

References

1993 births
Living people
Footballers from Dumfries
Scottish footballers
Scottish Football League players
Queen of the South F.C. players
Pafos FC players
Association football fullbacks
Scottish Professional Football League players
Dundee F.C. players
Scottish expatriate footballers
Expatriate footballers in Cyprus
Scottish expatriates in Cyprus
Ermis Aradippou FC players
Partick Thistle F.C. players